Enampore is a village in the Casamance region of Senegal. It lies about 23 kilometres from the Casamance's chief town Ziguinchor. It is noted for its impluvium houses, which are a distinctive feature of Jola architecture.

References 

Geography of Senegal
Casamance
Populated places in the Ziguinchor Department